Wayne Hall may refer to:

 Wayne Hall (footballer) (born 1968), English former footballer
 Wayne Denis Hall (born 1951), Australian academic
 Wayne Hall (ice hockey) (born 1939), ice hockey player in the National Hockey League